Mark James Tucker (born 27 April 1972) is an English former professional footballer who played in the Football League as a right back.

Honours 
Woking
 FA Trophy: 1993–94, 1994–95

References

 . Retrieved 22 October 2013

1972 births
Living people
Sportspeople from Woking
English footballers
Association football defenders
Fulham F.C. players
Woking F.C. players
Rushden & Diamonds F.C. players
Kettering Town F.C. players
Wisbech Town F.C. players
Hayes F.C. players
Worcester City F.C. players
Bedford Town F.C. players
English Football League players